The Augusta GreenJackets are a Minor League Baseball team of the Carolina League and the Single-A affiliate of the Atlanta Braves. They play their home games at SRP Park in North Augusta, South Carolina.

History

Augusta was a member of the South Atlantic League from 1980 to 2020. Before the San Francisco Giants took over the club's affiliation after the 2004 season, the GreenJackets were a part of the Boston Red Sox organization. Prior to that, the Red Sox replaced the Pittsburgh Pirates in Augusta. The GreenJackets boast third baseman Kevin Youkilis and Dustin Pedroia as the only prospects to make the Red Sox roster, although knuckle baller Tim Wakefield pitched there in 1989 with the Pirates organization. The Red Sox' relationship with Augusta met with immediate success when the GreenJackets won the South Atlantic League championship in their first year as an affiliate team.

The 2020 season was postponed and later cancelled for Augusta and all of MiLB due to the COVID-19 pandemic. In the MiLB reorganization of 2021, the Braves invited Augusta to be their new Low-A affiliate.

The team is named after The Masters golf tournament held across the Savannah River in Augusta, Georgia, where the winner receives a green jacket. The team logo features a yellowjacket wasp colored green, wearing a tam o' shanter cap, associated with golf.

One week a year the GreenJackets assume the name of their alter ego and become the Pimento Cheese. This name also pays homage to the Masters tournament with the iconic pimento cheese sandwich, a popular concession item sold at the tournament, featured prominently as the team's logo on caps, jerseys, and all team branding.

Stadium

The GreenJackets play in SRP Park, a 4,782-seat stadium which opened on April 12, 2018. SRP Park is part of a development featuring apartments, a senior living facility, office space, retail, a hotel, and a beer garden. The North Augusta-based SRP Federal Credit Union purchased the naming rights to the ballpark.

SRP Park replaced Lake Olmstead Stadium as the home of the GreenJackets.  Lake Olmstead Stadium was built primarily as a baseball facility between 1994 and 1995. The stadium seated 4,400 with nearly 1,000 box seats, 830 reserved seats, over 2,000 general admission seats.

Awards
In 2008, the team was voted by fans as the best minor league team in the Minor League Baseball Yearly (MiLBY) Awards.

Notable alumni

  Moisés Alou MLB All-Star
 Bronson Arroyo MLB All-Star
 Madison Bumgarner 4 x MLB All-Star; 2014 World Series Most Valuable Player
 Carlos García MLB All-Star
 Clint Courtney (1948)
 Fred Gladding (1958)
 Vaughn Grissom (2021)
 Brian Horwitz
 Ralph Houk (1941) Manager: 1961 & 1962 World Series Champion - New York Yankees
 Roberto Kelly (2007, MGR) 2 x MLB All-Star
 Jason Kendall (1993) 3 x MLB All-Star
 Jon Lester (2003) 4 x MLB All-Star
 Orlando Merced (1988)
 Brandon Moss (2004) MLB All-Star
 Wally Moses (1931) 2 x MLB All-Star
 Aramis Ramirez (1996) 3 x MLB All-Star
 Dustin Pedroia (2004) 4 x MLB All Star; 2007 AL Rookie of the Year; 2008 AL Most Valuable Player
Hanley Ramírez (2003) MLB All-Star; 2009 NL Batting Title; 2006 NL Rookie of the Year
 Sergio Romo (2006) MLB All-Star
 Freddy Sanchez (2000) 3 x MLB All-Star
 Pablo Sandoval (2006) 2 x MLB All-Star; 2012 World Series Most Valuable Player
 Spencer Strider (2021)
 Brian Wilson (2005) 3 x MLB All-Star
 Tim Wakefield (1999) MLB All-Star
 Rube Walker (1962)
 Tony Womack (1992) MLB All-Star
 Kevin Youkilis (2001-2002) 3 x MLB All-Star

Roster

References

External links

 
 Statistics from Baseball-Reference

Sports in Augusta, Georgia
Professional baseball teams in Georgia (U.S. state)
Professional baseball teams in South Carolina
Atlanta Braves minor league affiliates
San Francisco Giants minor league affiliates
Boston Red Sox minor league affiliates
Pittsburgh Pirates minor league affiliates
Baseball teams established in 1994
Detroit Tigers minor league affiliates
St. Louis Cardinals minor league affiliates
1994 establishments in Georgia (U.S. state)
Carolina League teams
Defunct South Atlantic League teams